Osmín Hernández Hernández (born 27 June 1970) is a Cuban retired footballer.

Club career
Hernández played his entire career for local side Pinar del Río, except for half a season in Germany with Bonner SC, when then Cuban leader Fidel Castro approved for the whole Cuban team to join the German 4th level side for part of the 1998/99 season. He also had a trial with Olympique Marseille along with compatriot Lázaro Darcourt in 1998, only for a Cuban official to prevent them to sign professional terms. Then, he had a season in the Norwegian third tier with Fløy alongside another Cuban, Serguei Prado. Back in Cuba, he was the league's top goalscorer in 1996 and 1997.

International career
One of the leading players of the Cuban team during the 1990s, he made his international debut for Cuba in 1995 and has earned a total of 46 caps, scoring 12 goals. He represented his country in 18 FIFA World Cup qualification matches (1 goal) and was a non-playing squad member at the 1998 CONCACAF Gold Cup.

His final international was a June 2004 World Cup qualification match against Costa Rica.

International goals
Scores and results list Cuba's goal tally first.

References

External links
 

1970 births
Living people
People from Pinar del Río
Association football midfielders
Cuban footballers
Cuba international footballers
1998 CONCACAF Gold Cup players
FC Pinar del Río players
Bonner SC players
Flekkerøy IL players
Cuban expatriate footballers
Expatriate footballers in Germany
Cuban expatriate sportspeople in Germany
Expatriate footballers in Norway
Cuban expatriate sportspeople in Norway